LGBT in Israel can refer to:
LGBT rights in Israel
LGBT history in Israel